Eucithara marginelloides is a small sea snail, a marine gastropod mollusk in the family Mangeliidae.

Description
The length of the shell attains 15 mm.

The interstices of the longitudinal ribs are either smooth or more or less thickly covered with fine revolving striae. The color of the shell is yellowish or ashwhite, with fine, rather close chestnut revolving lines, sometimes
interrupted by the ribs, sometimes crossing them, sometimes obsolete. The shoulder is usually tinged with chocolate.

Distribution
This marine species occurs off the Philippines, New Guinea and New Caledonia.

References

  Reeve, L.A. 1846. Monograph of the genus Mangelia. pls 1-8 in Reeve, L.A. (ed). Conchologia Iconica. London : L. Reeve & Co. Vol. 3.

External links
  Tucker, J.K. 2004 Catalog of recent and fossil turrids (Mollusca: Gastropoda). Zootaxa 682:1-1295
 
 MNHN, Paris: Eucithara marginelloides

marginelloides
Gastropods described in 1846